Karen Anne Bradley (née Howarth, born 12 March 1970) is a British Conservative Party politician who served as Secretary of State for Northern Ireland from 2018 to 2019, and has served as Member of Parliament (MP) for Staffordshire Moorlands since 2010.

Bradley was appointed to the Cameron Government in 2014 as Minister of State for the Home Department. During the formation of the May Government in July 2016, she was appointed to the Cabinet as Secretary of State for Culture, Media and Sport, where she remained until being appointed Northern Ireland Secretary in January 2018.

Early life and career
Bradley was born in Newcastle-under-Lyme. Her family moved to Buxton, Derbyshire and she was educated at the local comprehensive and Imperial College London, graduating with a BSc in mathematics.

In 1991, Bradley joined Deloitte & Touche and became a tax manager, and after seven years she became a senior tax manager with KPMG. In 2004 she set up business as a fiscal and economic consultant before rejoining KPMG in 2007, where she remained until her election to the House of Commons.

Parliamentary career

Bradley unsuccessfully contested Manchester Withington at the 2005 general election, coming third to the Liberal Democrats' John Leech.

Bradley was a member of the Conservative Party's A-List and was selected for Staffordshire Moorlands in July 2006. She was elected as the constituency's member of parliament at the 2010 general election.

Following her election to Parliament in 2010, Bradley was a member of the Work and Pensions Select Committee between July 2010 and October 2012, the Procedure Committee between October 2011 and November 2012, and in May 2012 was elected co-secretary of the backbench 1922 Committee.

In September 2012, Bradley was appointed as a junior Government whip. In December 2012, Bradley joined the Administration Committee, of which she was a member until March 2014. In February 2014, Bradley joined the Home Office as the Parliamentary Under-Secretary of State for Preventing Abuse, Exploitation and Crime.

In July 2016, Bradley was appointed to the position of Secretary of State for Culture, Media and Sport by Prime Minister Theresa May. In late November 2016, she denied the appointment of Althea Efunshile, a former deputy chief of Arts Council England, as a non-executive director on the board of the state-owned broadcaster, Channel 4. She was criticised because Efunshile was a black female candidate while the other four candidates were all white men and were either appointed or re-appointed. This action led to a letter of complaint being sent to her by a cross-party group of MPs. On 12 December 2017, the government announced the appointment which her successor ratified. In January 2018, Bradley was appointed Secretary of State for Northern Ireland after the resignation of James Brokenshire due to ill health. In July 2018, she came under criticism in the Northern Ireland Affairs Committee for failing to take action on British government discrimination against former soldiers and police. Andrew Murrison challenged her on her account of what she had done, and she said she would write to him. Sylvia Hermon commented: "I wait and wait for letters."

In a September 2018 interview for House magazine, a weekly publication for the Houses of Parliament, Bradley admitted she had not understood Northern Irish politics before being appointed Secretary of State for Northern Ireland, saying: "I didn't understand things like when elections are fought, for example, in Northern Ireland – people who are nationalists don’t vote for unionist parties and vice versa," she said.

In March 2019, Bradley defended killings by security forces during the Troubles in the Northern Ireland, stating that "The fewer than 10% [of killings] that were at the hands of the military and police were not crimes, they were people acting under orders and fulfilling their duties in a dignified and appropriate way.". This comment was criticised by numerous political parties in Northern Ireland, and some made calls for her to resign. A "clarification" on her remarks was issued by Bradley later that day in the House of Commons, and the following day she issued an apology. The families of those who died on Bloody Sunday in January 1972 claimed that Bradley was attempting to interfere in the British government's decision on whether or not to prosecute the soldiers involved in the incident.

Bradley was dismissed as Northern Ireland Secretary by Prime Minister Boris Johnson upon his appointment in July 2019.

Bradley was reelected at the 2019 general election, with an increased majority of 16,428 votes. She was elected as Chair of the Procedure Committee on 29 January 2020, defeating Bob Blackman to the post.

Personal life
Bradley is married to Neil Bradley. They have two sons. She is a fan of Manchester City Football Club.

Notes

References

External links
 karenbradley.co.uk — Bradley's website
 Bradley on TheyWorkForYou.com
 Bradley on Conservative Party site

|-

|-

1970 births
Living people
People from Newcastle-under-Lyme
People from Buxton
Alumni of Imperial College London
British Secretaries of State
21st-century British women politicians
Conservative Party (UK) MPs for English constituencies
Female members of the Cabinet of the United Kingdom
Female members of the Parliament of the United Kingdom for English constituencies
Members of the Privy Council of the United Kingdom
UK MPs 2010–2015
UK MPs 2015–2017
UK MPs 2017–2019
UK MPs 2019–present
Politicians from Staffordshire
People from Staffordshire Moorlands (district)
21st-century English women
21st-century English people
Free Enterprise Group